Silver link may refer to:

Silver Link, a Japanese animation studio
Silverlink, a former British train operating company
LNER Class A4 2509 Silver Link, a British steam locomotive
Burdekin Bridge, a road-rail bridge in Australia